Cristina Lourdes Gallardo-Domâs Tudezca is a soprano, born in Santiago, Chile, who frequently performs in operas by Puccini. 

Gallardo-Domâs made her debut as Madama Butterfly in 1990 at the Municipal Theatre of Santiago and, three years later, began performing in opera houses in Europe, making her La Scala debut in 1993 in La Rondine.

Gallardo-Domâs' many Puccini performances include: Turandot and Madama Butterfly at the Metropolitan Opera, Vienna State Opera, and Royal Opera House; La bohème at the Metropolitan Opera, La Scala, and Paris Opéra; Manon Lescaut at the Zurich Opera and Los Angeles Opera; Simon Boccanegra (by Verdi) at Vienna State Opera, Bavarian State Opera, and the Palau de les Arts Reina Sofia in Valencia; and Suor Angelica at Amsterdam's Concertgebouw and Teatro Colón. 

Gallardo-Domâs is known for her Madama Butterfly and was featured in the heavily promoted new production of this work that opened the 2006/2007 season at the Metropolitan Opera and marked the beginning of Peter Gelb's tenure as General Manager of the Met. According to her website , she was personally chosen by the director, Anthony Minghella, for this role, having successfully performed it previously at the Royal Opera.

In 2010 Gallardo-Domâs created the role of Matilde Neruda in the Los Angeles world premiere of Daniel Catán's Il Postino.

She has been recognized with top cultural honors in Chile: the Gabriela Mistral Award and the Gran Cruz Apostol Santiago. She  has also won top prizes in singing competitions.

Gallardo-Domâs lives in the Canary Islands, Spain, with her husband, a Spanish lawyer, and her two children.

External links
 Official website and discography

Living people
Singers from Santiago
Chilean operatic sopranos
Juilliard School alumni
Year of birth missing (living people)
Prize-winners of the Queen Elisabeth Competition
Chilean people of French descent
20th-century women opera singers
21st-century women opera singers
Chilean expatriates in Spain
21st-century Chilean women singers
20th-century Chilean women singers